"Tout Le Bonheur du Monde" is a single by the French reggae group, Sinsemilia, from their album Debout, Les Yeux Ouverts. The song was the first major success for the group. The music video features two animated characters exploring their world and eventually falling in love.

Charts

Weekly charts

Year-end charts

References

French songs
Reggae songs
2005 singles
2005 songs